1334 Lundmarka, provisional designation , is a carbonaceous asteroid from the outer region of the asteroid belt, approximately 30 kilometers in diameter. It was discovered on 16 July 1934, by German astronomer Karl Reinmuth at Heidelberg Observatory in southern Germany, and named after Swedish astronomer Knut Lundmark.

Orbit and classification 

Lundmarka is classified as C-type and X-type asteroid by the LCDB and Pan-STARRS, respectively. It orbits the Sun in the outer main-belt at a distance of 2.6–3.2 AU once every 4 years and 12 months (1,817 days). Its orbit has an eccentricity of 0.10 and an inclination of 11° with respect to the ecliptic. The body's observation arc begins with its official discovery observation at Heidelberg, as no precoveries were taken and no prior identifications were made.

Rotation period 

A rotational lightcurve of Lundmarka was obtained from photometric observations made at the Australian Oakley Southern Sky Observatory in September 2014. The lightcurve gave a rotation period of  hours with a brightness variation of 0.70 in magnitude.

In March 2016, a second period was published based on data from the Lowell Photometric Database. Using lightcurve inversion and convex shape models, as well as distributed computing power and the help of individual volunteers, a period of  hours was derived from the database's sparse-in-time photometry data.

Diameter and albedo 

According to the surveys carried out by the Infrared Astronomical Satellite (IRAS) and NASA's Wide-field Infrared Survey Explorer with its subsequent NEOWISE mission, Lundmarka measures 29.8 and 27.6 kilometers in diameter, respectively, and its surface has a corresponding albedo of 0.06 and 0.24. The Collaborative Asteroid Lightcurve Link derives an intermediary albedo of 0.146 and a diameter of 30.4 kilometers.

Naming 

This minor planet was named in memory of Swedish astronomer Knut Lundmark (1889–1958), who was the head of the Lund Observatory. He thoroughly analyzed galaxies and globular clusters, and pioneered in measuring galactic distances and absolute stellar magnitudes. Lundmark also appeared in national radio with programs on popular astronomy and the history of science. The official  was mentioned in The Names of the Minor Planets by Paul Herget in 1955. The lunar crater Lundmark is also named in his honour.

References

External links 
 Asteroid Lightcurve Database (LCDB), query form (info )
 Dictionary of Minor Planet Names, Google books
 Asteroids and comets rotation curves, CdR – Observatoire de Genève, Raoul Behrend
 Discovery Circumstances: Numbered Minor Planets (1)-(5000) – Minor Planet Center
 
 

001334
Discoveries by Karl Wilhelm Reinmuth
Named minor planets
19340716